Major Wilhelm Oxenius (9 September 1912 – 13 August 1979) was a German Wehrmacht officer during World War II.

Oxenius served as an aide to Colonel General Alfred Jodl during World War II as a staff officer at the Operations Directorate of the Oberkommando der Wehrmacht. He was also an Operations Officer for Panzergruppe West in France in June 1944.

Oxenius is notable for being a member and translator of the delegation that signed the German unconditional surrender at Reims on 7 May 1945 with Colonel General Jodl and General Admiral Hans-Georg von Friedeburg.

He was a prisoner of war from 10 May 1945 to 3 January 1948 and died aged 66.

See also
 German Instrument of Surrender

References

External links
 Details of the Surrender from a Stars and Stripes staff writer

1912 births
1979 deaths
Military personnel from Kassel
Recipients of the Iron Cross (1939), 1st class
German prisoners of war in World War II
German Army officers of World War II